Princess Adelheid-Marie of Anhalt-Dessau (25 December 1833 – 24 November 1916) was a Princess of Anhalt-Dessau and member of the House of Ascania. As the wife of Adolphe of Nassau, she was Duchess of Nassau from 1851 until 1866 and Grand Duchess of Luxembourg from 1890 until 1905.

Birth and family
Adelheid Marie was born in Dessau in the Duchy of Anhalt-Dessau on Christmas Day 1833 to Prince Frederick Augustus of Anhalt-Dessau and Princess Marie Luise Charlotte of Hesse-Kassel.

Marriage and issue
On 23 April 1851 in Dessau, as his second wife, she was married to Adolphe of Nassau, Duke of Nassau and later Grand Duke of Luxembourg. They had five children, of whom only two lived to the age of eighteen and to become prince and princess of Luxembourg:
 William IV (1852–1912), second Grand Duke of Luxembourg
 Prince Frederick of Nassau (28 September 1854 – 23 October 1855)
 Princess Marie of Nassau (14 November 1857 – 28 December 1857)
 Prince Francis Joseph William of Nassau (30 January 1859 – 2 April 1875)
 Princess Hilda of Nassau (1864–1952), married Friedrich II, Grand Duke of Baden.

Grand Duchess consort of Luxembourg
Duke Adolph supported the Austrian Empire in the Austro-Prussian War of 1866. After Austria's defeat, Nassau was annexed to the Kingdom of Prussia and Adolph and Marie Adelheid lost their throne on 20 September 1866.

In 1890, King William III of the Netherlands died. His only daughter, Wilhelmina, succeeded on his death without surviving male issue to the Dutch throne, but was excluded from the succession to the Grand Duchy of Luxembourg by the House treaty between the two branches of the House of Nassau. The Grand Duchy, which had been linked to the Netherlands since 1815, passed to the Dutch royal family's distant relative – the dispossessed Duke Adolphe – on 23 November 1890, in accordance with the Nassau Family Pact. Marie Adelheid now became Grand Duchess of Luxembourg.

Death
Marie Adelheid died on 24 November 1916 in Königstein im Taunus, German Empire.

Legacy
The Grand Dukes of Luxembourg are still descendants of Adolphe and Marie-Adelheid, although cognatically, since the very independence of the Grand-Duchy required an alteration of the succession laws at the absence of male heirs.

Ancestry

See also

 Prix Grand-Duc Adolphe

References

|-

|-

House of Ascania
Grand Ducal Consorts of Luxembourg
1833 births
1916 deaths
House of Nassau-Weilburg
Burials in the Royal Crypt of Weilburg Schlosskirche